Mankato Regional Airport  is a public airport located five miles (8 km) northeast of the central business district of Mankato, a city in Blue Earth County, Minnesota, United States. This airport is publicly owned by the city of Mankato.  The airport is home to Northstar Aviation (FBO) and Minnesota State University's flight training program. Base to Mn composite Squadron Mn 048 Civil Air Patrol (CAP/USAF-AUX)

Facilities and aircraft
 Runway 4/22: 4,000 x 75 ft (1,219 x 23 m), Surface: Asphalt

For the 12-month period ending 31 July 2015 the airport had 119,320 aircraft operations, an average of 327 per day: 97% general aviation, 3% air taxi and less than 1% military. In March 2017, there were 74 aircraft based at this airport: 56 single-engine, 13 multi-engine, 2 jet, 2 helicopter and 1 ultralight.

History 
By 1960, North Central Airlines provided schedule service to Minneapolis–St. Paul International Airport and Sioux Falls, SD with stops at Mankato, Fairmont, and Worthington. North Central Airlines final scheduled flight using a Douglas DC-3 took place on 7 February 1969 as flight #774.  It flew the 30 minute leg from Mankato, Minnesota to Minneapolis/St. Paul Airport.

On December 22, 1969 the Mankato City Council approved Imperial Airways Inc. request to begin commercial helicopter service between Mankato and the Minneapolis/St Paul International Airport.  The service started on December 26, 1969 with two daily round trip flights using Bell Jet Rangers.  On December 4, 1970 Imperial Airways announced it was canceling its scheduled helicopter service flights in Minnesota.  Other routes that where cut its routes from Minneapolis-St Paul International Airport to Rochester, Minnesota and to downtown Minneapolis.

While no airlines serve Mankato Regional Airport as of August 2020, Sun Country Airlines, in partnership with Landline, began bus service between Mankato and Minneapolis–St. Paul International Airport in November 2019. This service allows customers to book one itinerary from Mankato that includes bus transfer to Minneapolis, and then their flight to the next destination. Customers are allowed to check baggage in Mankato to be transferred directly to the aircraft, but must clear security in Minneapolis. It also offers rebooking services in case flights or buses are delayed, ensuring customers are booked on another flight or bus to their final destination.

On August 17, 2020, Air Force One landed at Mankato Regional Airport for the first time. Due to the small size of the airport, President Donald J. Trump used a Boeing C-32 as Air Force One, instead of the usual Boeing VC-25.

References

External links 

Airports in Minnesota
Buildings and structures in Blue Earth County, Minnesota
Transportation in Blue Earth County, Minnesota
Mankato, Minnesota